The Anderssons Rock the Mountains is a Swedish comedy, children's and family film, which opened at cinemas in Sweden on 19 December 2014. The film, partly recorded in Åre, is the final in a trilogy of Sune films.

Plot
The film tells the story of the Andersson's family skiing vacation to the Swedish parts of the Scandinavian Mountains.

Production
The mountain scenes were shot during March and April 2014 near Åre, at places like Ullådalen and Duved. Shooting also occurred at Edsåsdalen and Östersund. The work was later completed at Göteborg.

Actors
The following actors appear:

William Ringström - Sune
Morgan Alling - Rudolf
Anja Lundqvist - Karin
Julius Jimenez Hugoson - Håkan
Hanna Elffors Elfström - Anna
Julia Dufvenius - Sabina
Erik Johansson - Pontus
Kajsa Halldén - Sofie
Kalle Westerdahl - Ragnar
Frida Hallgren - Yvonne
Malte Gårdinger - Santos
Bonn Ulving - Pär Päron
Manuel Dubra - Santo's father
Patrik Zackrisson - olycks-Jörgen
Kristina Korths-Aspegren - olycks-Kicki
Martin Andersson - reindeer herd
Emma Melkersson - Linda
Emanuel Edoff - Peder
Pontus Eklöf - Roger
Jörgen Persson - man with sled dog
Ebbe Olsson - Thoma's father
Wiliam Mehler - Thomas
Jimmy Söderblom - ice sculptor
Maja Fahl - headteacher
Jon Olsson - himself
Jessica Almenäs - Let's Dance programme host
Tony Irving - Let's Dance jury member
Dermot Clemenger - Let's Dance jury member
Ann Wilson - Let's Dance jury member
Madeleine Claesson - Statist

Music
Music

Änglahund with Vikingarna
Canelloni, Macaroni with Lasse Holm
La belissima estate (One Beautiful Summer)
Diggi-Loo Diggi-Ley
La Bamba with The Music Super Men
De sista ljuva åren
Papaya Coconut with Kikki Danielsson
De ä bar å åk with the Swedish National Skiing Team

Home video
The film was released to DVD and blu-ray in 2015.

References

External links

2010s children's comedy films
Films based on works by Anders Jacobsson and Sören Olsson
Films directed by Hannes Holm
Films set in Sweden
Films shot in Sweden
Swedish comedy films
2010s Swedish-language films
Skiing films
Films about vacationing
Swedish sequel films
2014 films
Films shot in Germany
2014 comedy films
2010s Swedish films